Maria Eduarda De Almeida "Duda" Arakaki (born 12 August 2003) is a Brazilian rhythmic gymnast. She represented Brazil at the 2018 Summer Youth Olympics and competed in the individual all-around, and she represented Brazil at the 2020 Summer Olympics in the group all-around.

Career 
Arakaki began rhythmic gymnastics when she was six years old. She competed at the 2018 Junior Pan American Championships and won the bronze medal in the team event and finished sixth in the individual all-around. She won the gold medal in the all-around at the 2018 South American Youth Championships. She competed at the 2018 Summer Youth Olympics in Buenos Aires. In the individual all-around, she finished thirty-fourth in the qualification round. Additionally, in the mixed multi-discipline team event, her team finished seventh. In 2019, she had surgery on her knee and did not compete that year.

Arakaki began training with Brazil's senior group in 2020. Her first major competition with the group was the 2021 Pan American Championships in Rio de Janeiro. The group won the gold medal in the group all-around and secured the continental quota place for the 2020 Olympic Games. The group additionally won the gold medals in both the 5 balls and the 3 hoops + 4 clubs event finals.

Arakaki was selected to compete for Brazil at the 2020 Summer Olympics in the group all-around alongside Beatriz Linhares, Déborah Medrado, Nicole Pírcio, and Geovanna Santos. They finished twelfth in the qualification round for the group all-around.

References

External links 
 
 

2003 births
Living people
Brazilian rhythmic gymnasts
Olympic gymnasts of Brazil
Gymnasts at the 2020 Summer Olympics
People from Maceió
Gymnasts at the 2018 Summer Youth Olympics
Sportspeople from Alagoas